Goreyan Nu Daffa Karo is a 2014 Indian Punjabi-language romantic comedy film starring Amrinder Gill and actress Amrit Maghera.

Plot
For Kala, a boy from a village in Punjab, India, it is love at first sight when he sees Aleesha, an Indo-Canadian girl. Kala also helps clear obstacles in the way of marriage of his brother Roop to his white Canadian girlfriend, Julia. Roop's father does not want him marrying a white girl. Kala fights the cultural and historical differences to bring together and unite the two families.

Production
The film is shot at locations in India and Canada.

Cast
 Amrinder Gill as Kala
 Amrit Maghera as Aleesha
 Yograj Singh as Najar Singh 
 Binnu Dhillon as Maan Saab
 Aman Khatkar as Roop
 Terence H. Winkless as Albert 
 Rana Ranbir as Kala's brother in law
 Karamjit Anmol as Kala's uncle 
 Sardar Sohi as Kala's uncle
 Azam aylaa Nokhandan as Julia

Soundtrack

Awards

PTC Punjabi Film Awards 2015

Won
Best Screenplay – Amberdeep Singh

Nominations
 Best Story writer – Amberdeep Singh
 Best Screenplay – Amberdeep Singh
 Best Dialogues – Amberdeep Singh
 Best Music Director – Jatinder Shah
 Best playback Singer(male) – Prabh Gill
 Popular Song of the year – Prabh Gill & Amrinder Gill
 Best performance in comic role – Binnu Dhillon
 Best Supporting Actor – Yograj Singh
 Best Director – Pankaj Batra
 Best Actor – Amrinder Gill
 Best Film

References

2014 films
2014 romantic comedy films
Punjabi-language Indian films
2010s Punjabi-language films
Films directed by Pankaj Batra
Films scored by Jatinder Shah
Indian romantic comedy films